Aneta Hladíková (born 30 August 1984) is a Czech racing cyclist who represents the Czech Republic in BMX. She has been selected to represent the Czech Republic at the 2012 Summer Olympics in the women's BMX event. She finished in 10th place. In June 2015, she competed for the Czech Republic at the inaugural European Games in women's BMX. She earned a bronze medal.

References

External links
 
 
 
 

1984 births
Living people
BMX riders
Czech female cyclists
Olympic cyclists of the Czech Republic
Cyclists at the 2012 Summer Olympics
European Games medalists in cycling
European Games bronze medalists for the Czech Republic
Cyclists at the 2015 European Games